Franco Chioccioli (born 25 August 1959 in Castelfranco di Sopra) is an Italian former professional road racing cyclist. The highlight of his career was his overall win in the 1991 Giro d'Italia.

Major results

1977
 1st  Overall Giro della Lunigiana
1981
 2nd Overall Giro della Valle d'Aosta
1982
 2nd Giro dell'Etna
 2nd Giro dell'Appennino
 4th Gran Premio Città di Camaiore
 6th Overall Giro del Trentino
 7th Giro di Toscana
1983
 1st  Young rider classification Giro d'Italia
 7th Milan–San Remo
 10th Overall Giro del Trentino
1st Stage 1
 10th Tre Valli Varesine
1984
 1st  Overall Giro del Trentino
1st Stage 2
 1st Coppa Agostoni
 3rd Coppa Placci
 3rd Giro dell'Etna
1985
 1st Giro del Friuli
 9th Overall Giro d'Italia
1st Stage 14
 9th Overall Giro del Trentino
1986
 4th Overall Giro di Puglia
 5th Overall Tour de Suisse
1st Stage 6
 6th Overall Giro d'Italia
1st Stage 8
 10th Trofeo Pantalica
1987
 1st Trofeo dello Scalatore
 1st Stage 4 Giro di Puglia
 2nd Giro dell'Etna
 2nd Trofeo Pantalica
 3rd Giro della Provincia di reggio Calabria
 8th Overall Tirreno–Adriatico
 8th Milan–San Remo
1988
 2nd Overall Giro di Puglia
1st Stage 4
 5th Overall Giro d'Italia
1st Stages 4b (TTT) & 6
 6th Giro di Toscana
1989
 4th Tre Valli Varesine
 5th Overall Giro d'Italia
 7th Giro di Toscana
1990
 1st Stage 4 Giro del Trentino
 6th Overall Giro d'Italia
1991
 1st  Overall Giro d'Italia
1st Stages 15, 17 & 20 (ITT)
 1st Coppa Sabatini
 2nd Road race, National Road Championships
 2nd Giro del Friuli
 4th Giro di Toscana
 4th GP Industria & Artigianato
 8th Overall Giro del Trentino
 8th Coppa Placci
1992
 1st  Overall Euskal Bizikleta
1st Stage 5
 1st Stage 15 Tour de France
 1st Stage 1 Giro del Trentino
 3rd Overall Giro d'Italia
1st Stage 20
 8th GP Industria & Artigianato
 10th Coppa Agostoni
1993
 2nd Overall Euskal Bizikleta
1st Stage 5

Grand Tour general classification results timeline

External links 

Official Tour de France results for Franco Chioccioli

1959 births
Living people
Italian male cyclists
Giro d'Italia winners
Italian Giro d'Italia stage winners
Italian Tour de France stage winners
Sportspeople from the Province of Pisa
Tour de Suisse stage winners
Cyclists from Tuscany